Stanislao Nievo (born 30 June 1928 in Milan, died in 2006 in Roma) was an Italian writer, journalist and director. He won the Strega Prize. He was the  great grandson of Ippolito Nievo, author of Le confessioni di un italiano.

Filmography
 Africa Addio, 1966
Mal d'Africa, 1968
 Sette donne a testa, 1972

Works
 Novels : Il prato in fondo al mare (Campiello Prize in 1975), Aurora (Mondadori, 1979), Il palazzo del silenzio (Mondadori, 1987), Le isole del Paradiso (Strega Prize in 1987), La balena azzurra (Mondadori, 1990), Il sorriso degli dei (Marsilio, 1997), Aldilà (Marsilio, 1999), Gli ultimi cavalieri dell'Apocalisse (in collaboration with E. Pennetta, Marsilio, 2004)
 Stories : Il padrone della notte (Mondadori, 1976), Il cavallo nero (Stampatori, 1979), Il tempo del sogno (Mondadori, 1993), Tre racconti (Italica, 1999)
 Poems : Viaggio verde (Mondadori, 1976), Canto di pietra (Mondadori, 1989), Barca solare (Rubbettino, 2001)

JournalismIl Giornale d'Italia, 1954–1962 Il Piccolo, 1959–1964La Repubblica, 1976La Stampa, 1978Il Gazzettino''

References

1928 births
2006 deaths
Journalists from Milan
Italian male journalists
Film people from Milan
Strega Prize winners
Premio Campiello winners
20th-century Italian journalists
Writers from Milan
20th-century Italian male writers